The 2015 Pac-12 Football Championship Game was played on Saturday, December 5, 2015 at Levi's Stadium in Santa Clara, California to determine the champion of the Pac-12 Conference in football for the 2015 season. It was the fifth championship game in Pac-12 Conference history. The game featured the South Division Co-champion USC Trojans against the North Division champion Stanford Cardinal. Stanford defeated USC 41–22 to win their third conference championship game.

History

The game was the fifth football conference championship for the Pac-12 Conference (or any of its predecessors). Last season, the Oregon Ducks defeated the Arizona Wildcats 51–13 for the conference championship and represented the conference in the 2015 Rose Bowl in Pasadena, California. The Ducks then advanced to play in the first CFP National Championship on January 12, 2015 against the Ohio State Buckeyes for the national championship.

Teams
The Stanford Cardinal faced the USC Trojans for the second time in the 2015 season, having won by a score of 41–31 at Los Angeles Memorial Coliseum earlier in the year.

Stanford

Stanford returned to the Pac-12 Championship for the third time since its inception. Stanford was led by fifth-year head coach David Shaw, QB Kevin Hogan, and RB Christian McCaffrey. McCaffrey averaged 255 all-purpose yards heading into the game.

USC

USC competed in the championship game for the first time since the conference expanded to 12 teams. USC and Utah tied for first place in the South Division, but USC won the tiebreaker by beating the Utes in the head-to-head matchup that season. Leading the team were senior QB Cody Kessler, freshman TB Ronald Jones II, sophomore WR JuJu Smith-Schuster, sophomore CB-WR-RET Adoree’ Jackson.

Game summary

Scoring summary

Statistics

See also
 List of Pac-12 Conference football champions
 Stanford–USC football rivalry

Notes
 John Ondrasik of Five for Fighting performed during the game.

References

Championship
Pac-12 Football Championship Game
Stanford Cardinal football games
USC Trojans football games
Pac-12 Football
Pac-12 Football
Sports competitions in Santa Clara, California
American football competitions in California